Robert Lester Ferguson (April 18, 1919 – May 23, 2008) was a Major League Baseball pitcher. He appeared in nine games, including two starts, for the Cincinnati Reds in 1944. He pitched professionally for thirteen years, playing in the minor leagues from 1938 until 1950.

References

External links
, or Retrosheet

1919 births
2008 deaths
Major League Baseball pitchers
Cincinnati Reds players
Evergreen Greenies players
Andalusia Bulldogs players
Tallassee Indians players
Montgomery Rebels players
Memphis Chickasaws players
Birmingham Barons players
San Diego Padres (minor league) players
Seattle Rainiers players
Meridian Millers players
Anniston Rams players
Baseball players from Alabama